In classical algebraic geometry, the genus–degree formula relates the degree d of an irreducible plane curve  with its arithmetic genus g via the formula:

Here "plane curve" means that  is a closed curve in the projective plane . If the curve is non-singular the geometric genus and the arithmetic genus are equal, but if the curve is singular, with only ordinary singularities, the geometric genus is smaller.

Proof 
The proof follows immediately from the adjunction formula. For a classical proof see the book of Arbarello, Cornalba, Griffiths and Harris.

Generalization 
For a non-singular hypersurface  of degree d in the projective space  of arithmetic genus g the formula becomes:

 

where  is the binomial coefficient.

Notes

See also
 Thom conjecture

References 

 Enrico Arbarello, Maurizio Cornalba, Phillip Griffiths, Joe Harris. Geometry of algebraic curves. vol 1 Springer, appendix A.
 Phillip Griffiths and Joe Harris, Principles of algebraic geometry, Wiley, chapter 2, section 1.
 Robin Hartshorne (1977): Algebraic geometry, Springer, .

Algebraic curves